Hospoda (in English Pub) is a Czech comedy television comedy that premiered on TV Nova. From 1996 to 1997, 52 episodes were aired.

Production 
The series was filmed in Barrandov Studios in Prague. Over the course of the series, 53 
episodes were aired, including a special episode containing the best of the series, which is currently missing from archives. Hospoda was the second TV Nova sitcom, after Nováci.

Many of the best Czech actors and actress appear in this series.

Plot 
The series follows the stories of ordinary people (the publican, entrepreneur, boilerman, psychiatrist, lawyer, chef ...), who meet in a pub for a beer.

Cast and characters 
 Petr Nárožný as victualler Jaroslav Dušek
 Josef Dvořák as chef František aka Kachna
 Ladislav Potměšil as Václav Novák
 Bronislav Poloczek as Tomáš Babula
 Jiří Krytinář as David Goliáš
 Jiří Menzel as Dr. Prášek MD
 Jan Kanyza as lawyer Dr. Vladimír Zatloukal
 Věra Tichánková as Vendula Jirásková
 Pavel Vondruška as accordionist Joska Váňa
 Lubomír Lipský as Alois Horáček
 Zuzana Bydžovská as waitress Mařka
 Václav Knop as pub owner Břetislav Jonáš

List of Episodes 
 A Testament
 A Cook
 A Flamendr
 A Finding
 A Forbes
 A Casanova
 A Concert
 A Bus Driver
 Invaders
 An Attorney's Fees Deposit
 Truants
 A Time Clock
 A Rose
 Defenders
 An Ascetic
 A Commercial
 A Merry Christmas
 A Disciple
 A Hobo
 A Strike
 A First Time Parent
 A Football
 An Inventor
 A Bomb
 A Debt Owner
 A Meeting
 A Snack
 The Non-Smoker Day
 A Prophecy
 An Injury
 A Healer
 A Stand-in
 Love is Love
 A Thief
 A Play
 An Artist
 A Joke
 A Honoree
 A Rendezvous
 A Gamble
 A Joker
 Greybeards
 Hookers
 A Trip
 An Uncle
 A Calamity
 A Client
 An Excursionist
 The Day After
 An Eyelet
 A Dog
 A Celebration
 The Best of*
*Missing episode

References

External links
 
 Hospoda's title song performed by Jaroslav Uhlíř during the celebration of 15th anniversary of TV Nova at YouTube.com

TV Nova (Czech TV channel) original programming
Czech comedy television series
1996 Czech television series debuts
1997 Czech television series endings